Jeremy Clark (born June 29, 1994) is an American football cornerback for the Saskatchewan Roughriders. He played college football at Michigan, and was drafted by the New York Jets in the sixth round in the 2017 NFL Draft.

Early years
Clark was lettered twice in track and field while in high school. He also was selected to the Kentucky Bluegrass all-star and all-state first-team.

Professional career
Clark was drafted by the New York Jets in the sixth round, 197th overall pick in the 2017 NFL Draft. He was placed on the Reserve/Non-Football Injury list due to an ACL injury he suffered back in college. He was activated off NFI to the active roster on December 8, 2017.

On September 1, 2018, Clark was waived by the Jets and was signed to the practice squad the next day. He was promoted to the active roster on December 1, 2018.

On August 4, 2019, Clark was waived/injured by the Jets. After clearing waivers, he was placed on injured reserve on August 5. He was waived from injured reserve on September 2.

Clark signed with the Seattle Dragons of the XFL in December 2019. He had his contract terminated when the league suspended operations on April 10, 2020.

Clark signed with the Saskatchewan Roughriders of the Canadian Football League on December 21, 2020.

References

External links
Michigan Wolverines bio

1994 births
Living people
American football cornerbacks
American football safeties
Michigan Wolverines football players
New York Jets players
People from Madisonville, Kentucky
Players of American football from Kentucky
Seattle Dragons players
Saskatchewan Roughriders players